This is a list of news aircraft accidents and incidents.



Accidents occurring while gathering news 
F = fatalities;  I = injuries

Accidents occurring outside news-gathering activities 
F = fatalities;  I = injuries

References

News aircraft